One of the Best is a 1927 British silent historical drama film directed by T. Hayes Hunter and starring Carlyle Blackwell, Walter Byron and Eve Gray. It was based on a play by Seymour Hicks. Film historian Rachael Low described it as an "unsophisticated costume drama". The 'drumming out' scene of Lieutenant Keppel was filmed at Hounslow Barracks using the officers and men of the Royal Fusiliers wearing 1820s uniforms.

Cast
 Carlyle Blackwell as Philip Ellsworth 
 Walter Byron as Lieutenant Dudley Keppel
 Eve Gray as Mary Penrose 
 Randle Ayrton as General Gregg 
 James Carew as Colonel Gentry 
 Julie Suedo as Claire Melville 
 James Lindsay as Maurice de Gruchy 
 Pauline Johnson as Esther 
 Elsa Lanchester as Kitty 
 Charles Emerald as Private Jupp 
 Cecil Barry as  Lieutenant Wynne 
 Simeon Stuart as Squire Penrose 
 Harold Huth as Adjutant

References

Bibliography
 Low, Rachael. The History of British Film, Volume 4 1918-1929. Routledge, 1997.

External links

1927 films
1920s historical drama films
British historical drama films
British mystery drama films
British silent feature films
Films directed by T. Hayes Hunter
British films based on plays
Gainsborough Pictures films
Films set in the 1820s
Films set in England
British black-and-white films
1920s mystery drama films
1927 drama films
1920s English-language films
1920s British films
Silent historical drama films
Silent mystery drama films